Surkhrud is a village in eastern Afghanistan in Nangarhar Province. Located at the west side of Jalalabad, near the Kabul River and the highway between Jalalabad and Kabul.

Opium poppy was grown in Surkrud in the past, but stopped when it was outlawed by the Taliban.  Currently main crops there are wheat, corn and rice.

See also 
Nangarhar Province

References

Populated places in Nangarhar Province